James Dunn Mathis at age 16 was the youngest pilot to fly solo across the United States.  He was formerly the Republican candidate for the United States Congress in Maryland's 2nd congressional district.

Early life, career, and family
Mathis was born in Baltimore, Maryland.  At the age of sixteen, Jimmy piloted a single engine Cessna 172 solo from Ocean City, Maryland to Long Beach, California, becoming the youngest solo aviator ever to fly cross country.  Although there had been previous claims by younger "pilots" that they were the youngest pilot to fly coast-to-coast, they were accompanied by licensed pilots/instructors because they were not legally old enough to fly an airplane solo and as "pilot in command".  Jimmy Mathis made the flight, after over 100 hours of training, and with a Student Pilot Certificate in his pocket.  Jimmy planned and coordinated his trip with his instructors, Harry Kraemer and David Moeslein.

He had no blanket, no pillow.  Overnight stays were with aviation businesses and Aviation Safety Counselor Associates.  However, when he arrived in Cahokia, Illinois things didn't work out so well, so he called his dad who said he could stay wherever he wanted.  He crossed the Mississippi River and stayed at Adam's Mark hotel in St. Louis MO over a rainy 4 July weekend.

Currently Jimmy hosts a Saturday morning talk show on Baltimore radio station WBAL, AM-1090.

Marriage and family
Currently Mathis lives in Baltimore County with his wife Christin Bethany Jones, social services counselor.

Professional life
After graduating from Towson Catholic High School, Mathis completed a 2-year intern program with Sinclair Broadcasting's FOX 45 Television in Baltimore working in all facets of television news & sports.

Subsequently he was hired by WBAL-TV - the NBC affiliate in Baltimore before moving to WTTG-TV - FOX 5 in Washington, D.C., where he covered news stories at the White House and the United States Congress.

In 2002 Mathis founded, Mathis Productions, Inc. and has produced a variety of programs ranging from reality, comedy and human interest

Over the years he has won numerous awards for photography and editing including two local Emmy Awards (one for photography and one for editing) at age 20. His resume now includes three local Emmys and five more nominations.

References

1978 births
Living people
Politicians from Baltimore
American aviators
Emmy Award winners
American television producers
Maryland Republicans